Ronald E. Crimm (March 11, 1935 – August 25, 2022) was an American politician in the state of Kentucky.

Crimm served in the Kentucky House of Representatives, which he was initially elected to in 1996, and was defeated in the 2016 primary. A Republican, he represented the 33rd district. He was an alumnus of Shippensburg University, which he graduated from in business in 1957. Prior to his election to the house, he was Chairman of the Jefferson County Republican Party, assuming the position in 1993. He was a former manager, teacher, and owner of Crimm Insurance. He was married to Phyllis and had two children.

References

1935 births
2022 deaths
Republican Party members of the Kentucky House of Representatives
People from Berks County, Pennsylvania
Politicians from Louisville, Kentucky
Shippensburg University of Pennsylvania alumni
20th-century American politicians
21st-century American politicians